The terræ filius (son of the soil) was a satirical orator who spoke at public ceremonies of the University of Oxford, for over a century. There was official sanction for personal attacks, but some of the speakers overstepped the line and fell into serious trouble. The custom was terminated during the 18th century. The comparable speaker at the University of Cambridge was called "prevaricator".

The bawdy poem The Oxford-Act (1693) contains a terræ filius speech, and is attributed to Alicia D'Anvers. Nicholas Amhurst took Terrae-filius, Or, The Secret History of the University of Oxford for the title of a series of periodical essays appearing from 1721, making up a 1726 book.

List of terræ filii

1591 Supposedly "Thomas Tomkins", although this individual cannot be traced. This is the earliest known terræ filius.
1592 John Hoskins, expelled
1637 "Mr. Masters," expelled 
1651 William Levinz and Thomas Careles
1655 Robert Whitehall and John Glendall
c. 1656 unnamed terræ filius was forcibly arrested at the podium and taken to Bocardo Prison due to offensive language
1657 Daniel Danvers
1657 Lancelot Addison, forced to retract
1658 Thomas Pittys, expelled
1661 (one of several) Arthur Brett
1663 John Edwards and Joseph Brooks
1664 William Cave and Richard Wood, "stopped in their regency"
1665-8 no terræ filius
1669 Thomas Hayes and Henry Gerard, both expelled
1670  no terræ filius
1671 John Roderham and Nicholas Hall
1673 John Shirley
1674 Charles Layfield
1675 Venables Keeling
1676 Balthazar Vigures, expelled, and John Crofts, chaplain of New College, who retracted after the speech so was not expelled
1681 John More, beaten with a cudgel following the speech
1682 Henry Boles and Jacob Allestry
1683 Michael Smith 
1684 Henry Walbanke and Thomas Easton
1693 Robert Turner and Henry Aldworth. Their full speeches (in Latin) survive in the notebook of Thomas Hearne.
1703 Robert Roberts; this year William Delaune was attacked
1706 Theodore Brooke
1713 Bernard Gardiner suppressed a Whig speech, as a threat to political stability. The speech was printed, but some copies were burned.
1713-33 No terræ filius
1733 No terræ filius but a speech was printed anonymously.
1763 Final appearance of the terræ filius, closely censored by the university and free of improper remarks.

Notes

History of the University of Oxford
Satirists